Palestinian Police may refer to:

 Palestinian Civil Police Force, the police department responsible for civil law enforcement in areas under control of the Palestinian National Authority. 
 
Preventive Security Force, another security and intelligence apparatus of the Palestinian Security Services. 
Palestine Police Force, the British colonial police service established in the British Mandate for Palestine